Carme is a feminine given name of two separate origins. The first is a Galician and Catalan form of Hebrew karmel, "garden". The second is from Greek Karmē, whose name means "she who cuts the grain", from keirein, "to cut".

People
 Carme Figueras, a Catalan politician
 Carme Laura Gil, a Catalan professor
 Carme Pinós, a Catalan architect
 Carme Riera, a Catalan professor
 Carme Ruscalleda, a Catalan chef

Other
 Carme (mythology), a figure in Greek mythology.

See also

Carle, surnames
Carle (given name)
 Karmei Tzur
 Carmen (given name)